Lord Marksman and Vanadis is an anime series adapted from the light novel of the same title by written by Tsukasa Kawaguchi and illustrated Yoshi☆o and Hinata Katagiri. Set during a civil war in an alternate Europe, the series follows the adventures of Tigrevurmud "Tigre" Vorn, who is a nobleman from the Brunish territory of Alsace that participates in a failed invasion attempt. Eleonora "Elen" Viltaria is a war maiden from the Zhctedian territory of Leitmeritz. Elen captures Tigre and recruits him into her army. The two are inevitably drawn into the conflict when Tigre's homeland Alsace is invaded. They must stop Duke Felix Aaron Thenardier's plot for power. The anime adapts material from the first five volumes of the light novel series.

Produced by Satelight and written and directed by Tatsuo Satō, the series premiered on October 4, 2014 on AT-X with later broadcasts on MBS, Tokyo MX, TVA and BS11, with advance screenings held on September 20, 2014 at United Cinemas Toyosu. In conjunction with the anime adaptation, a weekly mini series called  and a short narration by Yuka Iguchi as Limalisha called the Lim's Report was streamed online. Tigre and Vanadish is 2D animated with chibi sized characters that play out short segments of the light novel that were edited out of the anime. Lim's Report is a brief summary and analysis of the war tactics used by each forces in each episode. The first Blu-ray and DVD compilation was released by Media Factory on December 24, 2014, with later volumes being released monthly until May 27, 2015 for a total of six volumes. The volumes also includes the Tigre and Vanadish mini-series and other bonus material.

In North America, Funimation licensed the series for simulcast on their official website. After Funimation's one week exclusive rights ended, the anime was made available through the Hulu service in the United States. Crunchyroll has the streaming rights in Middle East, North Africa, and Europe excluding the Nordics, UK, and Ireland. Funimation scheduled the release of Lord Marksman and Vanadis in a complete Blu-ray/DVD boxset on February 9, 2016. In the United Kingdom, Lord Marksman and Vanadis is licensed by Anime Limited. It was released in a complete boxset on February 29, 2016. In Australia and New Zealand, the series is licensed by Madman Entertainment.

The background music for the series was composed by Masaru Yokoyama and Nobuaki Nobusawa. Three pieces of theme music are used throughout the series. The opening theme is titled . It is performed by Konomi Suzuki. The first ending theme is used for most of the series. The first ending theme is titled "Schwarzer Bogen" (lit. Black Bow). It is performed by Hitomi Harada. She is Valentina's voice actress. The second ending theme is used for the tenth episode. The second ending theme is titled . It is also performed by Konomi Suzuki.


Episode list

Lord Marksman and Vanadis

Tigre and Vanadish

See also
 Lord Marksman and Vanadis characters
 Lord Marksman and Vanadis light novels

References

External links
  
  at Funimation
 

Lord Marksman and Vanadis
E